Maryland elected its members October 5, 1818.

See also 
 1818 and 1819 United States House of Representatives elections
 List of United States representatives from Maryland

Notes 

1818
Maryland
United States House of Representatives